Condict is a surname. Notable people with the surname include:

Jemima Condict (1754–1779), American Revolutionary War era diarist
Lewis Condict (1772–1862), politician
Silas Condict (1738–1801), New Jersey delegate to the Continental Congress
Ira Condict (1764–1811), the third President of Queen's College (now Rutgers University)

See also
Edward Faitoute Condict Young, banker